Esther Mwila Banda (born 4 November 1958) is a Zambian former politician. She served as Member of the National Assembly for Chililabombwe from 2006 until 2016, and was a Deputy Minister between 2011 and 2016.

Biography
Banda studied for a BA in sociology and worked as a sociologist. She contested the 2001 general elections as the United Party for National Development candidate in Chililabombwe, but came second to Movement for Multi-Party Democracy candidate Wamundila Muliokela. In the 2006 general elections Banda was the Patriotic Front candidate and defeated Muliokela (who was then Minister of Defence), becoming the constituency's MP. She was re-elected in the 2011, after which she was appointed Deputy Minister Local Government, Housing, Early Education and Environmental Protection. The following year she became Deputy Minister in the newly created Ministry of Gender and Child Development. In February 2015 she became Deputy Minister of Tourism and Arts after Edgar Lungu became President. She also held the position of National Women's Chairperson within the Patriotic Front.

Banda did not run in the 2016 general elections, and was succeeded as Chililabombwe MP by the PF candidate Richard Musukwa.

References

1958 births
Living people
Patriotic Front (Zambia) politicians
Members of the National Assembly of Zambia
21st-century Zambian women politicians
21st-century Zambian politicians